Sadashiv Raoji Patil  (10 October 1933 – 15 September 2020) was an Indian cricketer who played in one Test in 1955. He also played 36 First-class matches for Maharashtra.

References

1933 births
2020 deaths
India Test cricketers
Indian cricketers
Maharashtra cricketers
West Zone cricketers
People from Kolhapur
Cricketers from Maharashtra